Zebina tridentata is a species of minute sea snail, a marine gastropod mollusk or micromollusk in the family Zebinidae.

Description
The size of the shell varies between 4 mm and 12 mm.

Distribution
This species occurs in the Red Sea and in the Western Pacific and off the Philippines.

References

 Vine, P. (1986). Red Sea Invertebrates. Immel Publishing, London. 224 pp
 Bosch D.T., Dance S.P., Moolenbeek R.G. & Oliver P.G. (1995) Seashells of eastern Arabia. Dubai: Motivate Publishing. 296 pp.

External links
 
 Michaud A. L. G. (1830). Description de plusieurs espèces de coquilles du genre Rissoa. Lyon, Perrin, 19 pp. + 1 pl

tridentata
Gastropods described in 1830